Kelly Overton is an author, activist and founder of Mojave Animal Protection (MAP) and Border Kindness.

Education

Kelly Overton received a BA in Human Services Management from the University of Massachusetts Boston, an MPH in International Health and Development from Tulane University School of Public Health & Tropical Medicine in New Orleans, a graduate certificate in Conservation Biology from Columbia University's Center for Environmental Research and Conservation, and an MPA from Harvard University's John F Kennedy School of Government.

Publication

His writings on humanity's mistreatment of animals have appeared in The Washington Post, Boston Herald, The Philadelphia Inquirer, Austin American-Statesman, The Buffalo News, The Baltimore Sun and CounterPunch.

Kelly Overton was a contributor with Tom Regan, Lee Hall and others to the 2008 Greenhaven Press Current Controversies text book The Rights of Animals and co-wrote (with Peter Singer) the Preface to the 2010 edition of Outlawed In Europe (Archimedean Press). In 2016, Kelly Overton: Animals, Culture & Cruelty a collection of his writings was a best selling eBook.

Activism
In July 2016 Overton walked 200 miles from Joshua Tree, California to Las Vegas, Nevada to bring attention to the environmental protection needs of the Mojave Desert.

He curated Resistance As Art, an April 2017 exhibit of animal, environmental and ecological justice art works. The exhibit includes works by Sue Coe, Marina DeBris, Dana Ellyn, Jonathan Horowitz, Jenny Kendler, Andy Singer and Jess X. Snow. 

In July 2018 Kelly Overton walked 100 miles between Palm Springs, California and Mexicali, Mexico to raise money for Refugee and Immigrant Center for Education and Legal Services and in protest of Trump administration family separation policy.

In September 2019 Overton curated Art Across Borders: A Migrating Exhibit for Border Kindness. The exhibit showed in Mexicali, Mexico and Los Angeles, California and included work created by Sue Coe, Ramiro Gomez and Jenny Kendler.

See also
 List of animal rights advocates

Sources
 Duke and Duchess of Sussex show backing for anti-Trump wall charity, The Telegraph
 Asylum seekers forced to wait in Mexico face daily threat of violence, PBS NewsHour
 Meghan Markle and Prince Harry are Following Just 17 Instagram Accounts for a Special Reason, People
 Trump's 'shameful' migrant stance condemns thousands to violent limbo in Mexico, The Guardian
US is sending migrants back to Mexico. Thousands have missed a court date., CNN
 Asylum seekers report theft, exploitation in Mexicali's migrant shelters, The San Diego Union-Tribune
 Asylum seekers forced to 'remain in' Mexicali face long journey to court hearings, The San Diego Union-Tribune
 Heat and violence pose twin threats for asylum-seekers waiting at border NBC News
 Del Otro Lado De La Frontera KYMA Yuma
 After separation at the border months ago, some migrant families tearfully reunite, Los Angeles Times
 When Animals Suffer, So Do We, Washington Post
 Mexico – United States: A time bomb is forming on the border, Deutsche Welle
 Activist art rises across the desert, Desert Magazine
 Clinic Brings Dog Days to Nicaragua, Tico Times
 Send A Signal, Adopt A Mutt, Philadelphia Inquirer
 Stop Animal Testing, Baltimore Sun
 Michael Vick Proves Only Semi-Tough. Boston Herald
 Class Notes – Autumn 2011. Harvard Kennedy School Magazine
 Strong Men Protect Creatures That Are Vulnerable Buffalo News
 The Casualties Of Green Scare Counterpunch
 Many Youngsters Learn Hunter Safety Oakland Tribune
 A White Man's Survival Guide for Post Patriarchal America GirlieGirl Army
 The Obamas and the Million-Mutt March Counterpunch
 Animal Rights and Obama – Can He Build An Ark?, Counterpunch
 Ain't That Ruff Enough? Los Angeles Times
 Chimpanzees Deserve Our Compassion Austin American-Statesman
 Puerto Rico Aims to Trap Roaming Monkeys USA Today
 If There Is A Chimp Heaven Counterpunch
 Man finishes Joshua Tree-to-Vegas Hike for Mojave Awareness Desert Sun
 Man's extreme desert hike raising awareness for the Mojave Desert Sun
 The Rights of Animals  Greenhaven Press
 New Yorkers remain on call to rescue animals from Louisiana oil spill disaster New York Daily News
 Oil Spill Aid  Veg News magazine
Art Queen Exhibit Resistance As Art Opens Tomorrow KCDZ 107.7
Mendocino's Missing Cannabis Czar Goes For A Walk In The Desert  KZYX – Mendocino County's Public and Community Radio
Hundreds of Mendocino County cultivators in backlog limbo The Press Democrat
Volunteer Says Personal Risks Worth Helping Immigrants KMIR – NBC Palm Springs
Central American families to reunite with their children after being separated KYMA – Yuma
Primera familia de migrantes en ingresar a los ee uu para ser reunida con sus hijos KYMA – Telemundo
 Black Luck Vintage brings good vibes and deals Hi Desert Star
Border Kindness, activistas ayudan a inmigrantes en la frontera entre Mexicali y Caléxico Excelsior, Edicion Impresa, La Prensa
Influx of migrant children being dropped off at Mexicali shelters KYMA – Yuma
Migrants Wait In Mexicali NPR Weekend Edition Saturday – WBUR
Albergue migrante en Mexicali recibe apoyo de organizacion estadounidense KYMA – Telemundo

Living people
Year of birth missing (living people)
Columbia University alumni
Harvard Kennedy School alumni
Tulane University School of Public Health and Tropical Medicine alumni
University of Massachusetts Boston alumni
People from Liberal, Kansas
American animal rights activists